Events from the year 1441 in France

Incumbents
 Monarch – Charles VII

Events
 7 June - The University of Bordeaux is founded
 June - Richard, Duke of York arrives in Normandy following his appointment as English commander in the Hundred Years War

Births
 11 November Charlotte of Savoy, wife of Louis (died 1483)

Deaths
 5 January - John II of Luxembourg, Count of Ligny, soldier (born 1392)

References

1440s in France